Psalm 113 is the 113th psalm of the Book of Psalms, beginning in English in the King James Version: "Praise ye the Lord, O ye servants of the Lord". The Book of Psalms is part of the third section of the Hebrew Bible, and a book of the Christian Old Testament. In Latin, it is known as 'Laudate pueri Dominum.

In the slightly different numbering system used in the Greek Septuagint version of the bible and in the Latin Vulgate, this psalm is Psalm 112.

The psalm forms a regular part of Jewish, Catholic, Lutheran, Anglican and other Protestant liturgies. In Judaism, it is the first of the six psalms comprising the Hallel, a prayer of praise and thanksgiving recited on Rosh Chodesh (the first day of the Hebrew month) and Jewish holidays. In Catholicism, it is one of the psalms included in the vespers service. It has been set to music often, notably by Claudio Monteverdi in his Vespro della Beata Vergine of 1610.

Text

Hebrew Bible version 
Following is the Hebrew text of Psalm 113:

King James Version 
 From the rising of the sun unto the going down of the same the 's name is to be praised. 
 The  is high above all nations, and his glory above the heavens. 
 Who is like unto the  our God, who dwelleth on high, 
 Who humbleth himself to behold the things that are in heaven, and in the earth! 
 He raiseth up the poor out of the dust, and lifteth the needy out of the dunghill; 
 That he may set him with princes, even with the princes of his people. 
 He maketh the barren woman to keep house, and to be a joyful mother of children.

Verse 1
Praise the Lord! or Hallelujah
Praise, O servants of the Lord,Praise the name of the Lord!In the Douay-Rheims 1899 American Edition, the wording reads Praise the Lord, ye children: praise ye the name of the Lord, from the Latin pueri, literally meaning "boys". Methodist writer Joseph Benson suggests there is a special emphasis in calling the Levites to praise, as they "are peculiarly devoted to this solemn work, and sometimes termed God’s servants, in a special sense", along with a general call to congregation. 

 Uses 

 Judaism 
"Hallel" means praise in Hebrew. Psalm 113 is the first of six psalms (113–118) of which Hallel is composed. On all days when Hallel is recited, this psalm is recited in its entirety.
 It is one of the so-called Egyptian Hallel, called Egyptian Hallel because Psalm 114 (one of the Hallel psalms 113 to 118) refers to the leaving of Egypt, but all the psalms are divinely inspired writings by King David.
 Verse 2 is part of Baruch Hashem L'Olam during Maariv, the mezuman preceding Birkat Hamazon, is recited when opening the Hakafot on Simchat Torah, and is found in the repetition of the Mussaf Amidah on Rosh Hashanah.
 Verses 2–4 are the second thru fourth verses of Yehi Kivod of Pesukei Dezimra.

 Musical settings 
This psalm has been set to music often, as it is one of the psalms included in vespers, typically set in Latin as Laudate pueri Dominum. Claudio Monteverdi wrote a setting in his Vespro della Beata Vergine, published in 1610. Mozart set the text in his two vespers compositions, Vesperae solennes de Dominica, K. 321, and Vesperae solennes de confessore, K. 339.

Individual settings of the psalm include two by Marc-Antoine Charpentier (H.149, H.203, H.203 a),  five by Antonio Vivaldi, RV 600–603. Handel set it twice, a setting in F major which is his earliest extant autograph which may have been written as early as 1701/02 in Halle, HWV 236, and a setting composed in D major in Rome in 1707, HWV 237. Jan Dismas Zelenka wrote two settings, both for a single soloist, trumpet and orchestra, ZWV 81 (1729) and ZWV 82 (1725). In 1830, Mendelssohn set the psalm as one of 3 Motets for female choir and organ, Op. 39, No. 2.

In 1863, Bruckner set the psalm in German, Psalm 112 Alleluja! Lobet den Herrn, ihr Diener'', WAB 35.

References

Sources

External links 

 
 
 Text of Psalm 113 according to the 1928 Psalter
 Psalms Chapter 113 text in Hebrew and English, mechon-mamre.org
 Hallelujah! Praise, you servants of the LORD, praise the name of the LORD. text and footnotes, usccb.org United States Conference of Catholic Bishops
 Psalm 113:1 introduction and text, biblestudytools.com
 Psalm 113 – Praise to the LORD Who Lifts the Lowly. enduringword.com
 Psalm 113 / Refrain: From the rising of the sun to its setting let the name of the Lord be praised. Church of England
 Psalm 113 at biblegateway.com

113
Hallel